Chionodes pastor is a moth in the family Gelechiidae. It is found in North America, where it has been recorded from Utah and Arizona.

The larvae are leaf-tiers on Quercus arizonica and Quercus gambelii.

References

Chionodes
Moths described in 1999
Moths of North America